Maladies may refer to:
A synonym for the word diseases
Maladies (film), 2012 film directed by Carter and starring James Franco